Odontolabis castelnaudi is a beetle of the family Lucanidae.

References
 Lacroix, J.-P., 1984 - The Beetles of the World, volume 4, Odontolabini I (Lucanidae) - Genera Chalcodes, Odontolabis, Heterochtes. This is a very good revision of the genus Odontolabis

Lucaninae
Endemic fauna of Borneo
Invertebrates of Borneo
Odontolabis
Beetles described in 1862